Vinogradov Fracture Zone is an Antarctic undersea fracture zone named for Alexandr Vinogradov, a Russian scientist/geochemist and first Director of the Vernadsky Institute of Geochemistry (GEOKHI). The name was proposed by Dr. Galina Agapova of the Geological Institute of the Russian Academy of Sciences, and was approved in September 1997 (ACUF 272).

Geology of the Southern Ocean